Count Maximilian Anton Karl Baillet de Latour (14 December 173722 July 1806) was an Austrian general during the French Revolutionary Wars.

Biography 
Born at Latour Castle near Virton in the Austrian Netherlands (present-day Belgium), he joined the Austrian Army in 1755 and distinguished himself in the Seven Years' War. In 1772 he married Charlotte-Sophie de Guérin de La Marche (d-1806); their son, Count Theodor Franz Baillet von Latour, was Austrian minister of war during the Revolutions of 1848, and was murdered during the Vienna Uprising. His brother, Count Ludwig Wilhelm Anton Baillet de Latour-Merlemont (1753–1836), was also a general in Austrian service, until 1810, when he resigned, and joined the Grande Armée of Napoleon.

Latour achieved the rank of a Generalmajor in 1782. In the course of the 1789 revolt that led to the proclamation of the autonomous United States of Belgium, Latour was elevated to the rank of a Feldmarschall-Leutnant. His troops held the Duchy of Luxembourg and played a significant role in regaining the rebellious provinces by the end of 1790, which earned him the Military Order of Maria Theresa. From 1792 onwards Latour fought as an Austrian commander in the Wars of the First and Second Coalition. In 1805 Emperor Francis I of Habsburg appointed him president of the Hofkriegsrat, Latour nevertheless died shortly afterwards in Vienna.

1737 births
1806 deaths
18th-century Austrian people
Austrian soldiers
Austrian politicians
Counts of Baillet-Latour
Austrian people of Belgian descent
Austrian Empire military leaders of the French Revolutionary Wars
Military leaders of the French Revolutionary Wars
Austrian generals
Belgian Roman Catholics
Grand Crosses of the Military Order of Maria Theresa